Ethyl chloroformate is the ethyl ester of chloroformic acid. It is a reagent used in organic synthesis for the introduction of the ethyl carbamate protecting group and for the formation of carboxylic anhydrides.

Preparation 
Ethyl chloroformate can be prepared using ethanol and phosgene:

Safety 
Ethyl chloroformate is a highly toxic, flammable, corrosive substance. It causes severe burns when comes in contact with eyes and/or skin, can be harmful if swallowed or inhaled.

References

Chloroformates
Reagents for organic chemistry